The 14th Annual American Music Awards were held on January 26, 1987.

Winners and nominees

 
Other awards

Performers
Diana Ross – Touch By Touch
Genesis – Invisible Touch
Janet Jackson – Control 
Robert Palmer – I Didn't Mean to Turn You On
Whitney Houston – All at Once
Dionne Warwick, Gladys Knight, Diana Ross – That's What Friends Are For

References
 Archive

1987
1987 awards in the United States